Kyar Tot The Lal Maung Sakar is a 2019 Burmese drama film, directed by Mee Pwar starring Sai Sai Kham Leng, Phway Phway and Htun Htun. It is based on the popular novel of the same name of Ju. It is the second time shot film of this novel. The film, produced by Shwe Si Taw Film Production premiered in Myanmar on February 1, 2019.

Cast
Sai Sai Kham Leng as Nanda
Phway Phway as Tin Tin Zaw
Htun Htun as Phyo Kyaw

References

2019 films
2010s Burmese-language films
Burmese drama films
Films shot in Myanmar
2019 drama films